At least four ships of the French Navy have been named Tigre:

 , a 28-gun small ship of the line launched in 1642 and foundered in 1644.
 , a 74-gun ship of the line launched in 1793 and captured by the Royal Navy in 1795.
 , a  launched in 1924, acquired by Italy in 1942 returned to French service in 1943 and scrapped in 1955.

French Navy ship names